Teresa Piccini is a Mexican ten-pin bowler. She finished in 15th position of the combined rankings at the 2006 AMF World Cup.

References

Mexican people of Italian descent
Mexican ten-pin bowling players
Living people
Year of birth missing (living people)
Place of birth missing (living people)
Mexican sportswomen